London Underground Ltd v Edwards (No 2) [1997] IRLR 157 is a leading discrimination case relevant for UK labour law, concerning objective justification of indirect discrimination.

Facts
Ms Edwards, a single parent, could not keep up child care after the Underground altered its shift system. She had worked as a train driver for ten years.

The Tribunal held that they could have ‘easily, without losing the objectives of their plan and reorganisation, accommodated the applicant who was a long-serving employee… They did not address themselves to these issues’

Judgment
Morison J dismissed the employer's appeal. ‘It may be that London Underground would have wished to implement the single parent link but gave in to pressure from their predominantly male workforce.’ First, he said, ‘the more clear it is that the employers unreasonably failed to show flexibility in their employment practices, the more willing the tribunal should be to make a finding of unlawful discrimination.’ Second, employers can change rosters, but ‘should carefully consider the impact which a new roster might have on a section of their workforce.’ Third, nothing said here ‘should be construed as favouring positive discrimination.’

See also

UK labour law
EU labour law

Notes

References

Employment Appeal Tribunal cases
1997 in case law
1997 in British law
Railway litigation in 1997